Göran Malkar (born 7 April 1954) is a Swedish fencer. He competed in the individual foil event at the 1976 Summer Olympics and the team épée event at the 1980 Summer Olympics.

References

External links
 

1954 births
Living people
Swedish male épée fencers
Swedish male foil fencers
Olympic fencers of Sweden
Fencers at the 1976 Summer Olympics
Fencers at the 1980 Summer Olympics
People from Västerbotten
20th-century Swedish people